Oliver Balch is a British author and freelance writer who specializes in business and international affairs. He has written for The Guardian, the Daily Telegraph, Huffington Post, The Spectator, Literary Review, and the Financial Times.

Balch graduated from Durham University (Hatfield College) in 1998 with a first-class degree in History and subsequently completed an MPhil at Cambridge.

After leaving university he spent a year living in Bolivia and later moved to Argentina, where he began writing freelance. In 2018 he received a PhD in Latin American Studies from the University of Cambridge (Christ's College). His thesis was entitled "Pulp Fictions: The Role of Detachable Corporate Social Responsibility in Building Legitimacy for Uruguay’s Largest Ever Foreign Investment".

He has had three books published by Faber & Faber: Viva South America!  A Journey Round a Restless Continent (2009), India Rising: Tales from a Changing Nation (2012), and Under the Tump: Sketches of Real Life on the Welsh Borders (2016).

Oliver and his wife Emma are co-owners of Pottery Cottage, Clyro and are co-founders of the social enterprise, The Story of Books, based in Hay-on-Wye.

References

Living people
Year of birth missing (living people)
English travel writers
British journalists
Alumni of Hatfield College, Durham
Alumni of the University of Cambridge
Alumni of Christ's College, Cambridge